If I Had a Hi-Fi is the sixth studio album by American alternative rock band Nada Surf. It was released on June 8, 2010 on Mardev Records. It consists only of covers chosen by the band members themselves.

The album title is a palindrome.

Track listing
Original artists in brackets

"Electrocution" (Bill Fox) – 3:13
"Enjoy the Silence" (Depeche Mode) – 3:21
"Love Goes On!" (The Go-Betweens) – 3:02
"Janine" (Arthur Russell) – 1:04
"You Were So Warm" (Dwight Twilley) – 2:48
"Love and Anger" (Kate Bush) – 4:50
"The Agony of Laffitte" (Spoon) – 3:50
"Bye Bye Beauté" (Coralie Clément) – 3:37
"Question" (The Moody Blues) – 5:17
"Bright Side" (Soft Pack) – 3:06
"Evolución" (Mercromina) – 5:10
"I Remembered What I Was Going to Say" (The Silly Pillows) – 1:52
"Conquering Fox (Lino Mix)" - 6:34 (vinyl only bonus track)
"Conquering Fox (Dr. Isreal Mix) - 6:15 (vinyl only bonus track)
"Lexicon Dub" - (vinyl only bonus track)

Personnel:
Matthew Caws - vocals, guitar
Daniel Lorca - bass guitar, vocals
Ira Elliot - drums, vocals
additional personnel:
Doug Gillard - guitar
Joe McGinty - keyboards
Louie Lino - programming
Philip Peterson & Victoria Parker - string arrangements

Mixed by:
Joe Agnello at Head Gear, Brooklyn on 1, 5 & 10.
John Goodmanson at Bogroll, Seattle on 2, 3, 6, 9 & 11.
Louie Lino at Resonate, Austin on 4, 7, & 12.
Tom Beaujour at Nuthouse, Hoboken on 8.

Mastered by George Marino at Sterling Sound, assisted by Ryan Smith.

Nada Surf albums
2010 albums
Covers albums